The Danish Indian rupee was the currency of Danish India. It was subdivided into 8 fano, each of 80 kas. In 1845, Danish India became part of British India and the local rupee was replaced by the Indian rupee.

Modern obsolete currencies
Historical currencies of India
Danish India
1845 disestablishments
Currencies of the Kingdom of Denmark